Abdullah bin Mohammed Al Saidi "عبدالله بن محمد السعيدي" is the current Legal Affairs Minister of the Sultanate of Oman and the Chairman of the Board of Directors of the Oman Charitable Organization.  He has been the Minister of Legal Affairs since March 7, 2011.

Prior to his appointment as the Minister of Legal Affairs, Dr Al Saidi worked as an advocate in a private practice.

Abdullah was elected as a member of the Shura Council of Oman for two terms between 1991 and 1997.

He obtained his PhD in Law from Queen Mary, University of London in the year 2004.

References

Living people
Omani politicians
Members of the Consultative Assembly (Oman)
Alumni of Queen Mary University of London
Year of birth missing (living people)